Prevail may refer to:
Prevail (musician), a hip-hop artist from Vancouver
Prevail (album), an album by death metal band Kataklysm
Prevail I, a 2017 album by Canadian heavy metal band Kobra and the Lotus
Prevail II, a 2018 album by Canadian heavy metal band Kobra and the Lotus
USNS Prevail, a United States Navy vessel